Frank "The Tank" Dungan is an American television producer and writer who won a 1982 Primetime Emmy for the television show Barney Miller.  He is a graduate of Bowling Green State University.  He is a native of Philadelphia, Pennsylvania. Other movies and TV series include Mr. Mom (1983), Mr. Belvedere (1985-1989) and Sister Kate (1989-1990).

References

External links

American television producers
American television writers
American male television writers
Primetime Emmy Award winners
Living people
Bowling Green State University alumni
Year of birth missing (living people)